Kargan Rud District is a district (bakhsh) in Talesh County, Gilan Province, Iran. At the 2006 census, its population was 24,804, in 6,216 families.  The District has one city: Lisar.  The District has two rural districts (dehestan): Khotbeh Sara Rural District and Lisar Rural District.

The dialect of Kargan Rud is a variety of Talysh

References 

Talesh County
Districts of Gilan Province